Federigo Ubaldini (1610 - 1657) was an Italian Dante and Petrarch scholar, secretary to Cardinal Francesco Barberini, and later secretary to the papal consistory in Rome. He was born in Siena. He published a biography of Angelo Colocci and various notes on Renaissance poets. He created annotations about the Divine Commedy. In 1642, Federigo edited a publication of the work Il Tesoro by Brunetto Latini (c. 1220–1294), a guardian and teacher of Dante.

References

1610 births 
1657 deaths
People from Siena
17th-century Italian writers
Dante scholars